Robert Pache (26 September 1897 – 31 December 1974) was a Swiss footballer. He competed in the 1924 Summer Olympics. Pache was a member of the Swiss team, which won the silver medal in the football tournament.

He played for Servette FC, CA Paris and FSV Frankfurt. He coached FC Lausanne-Sport, Servette FC and Forward Morges.

References

External links

1897 births
1974 deaths
Swiss men's footballers
Switzerland international footballers
Footballers at the 1924 Summer Olympics
Olympic footballers of Switzerland
Olympic silver medalists for Switzerland
Swiss football managers
FC Lausanne-Sport managers
Servette FC managers
FSV Frankfurt players
Olympic medalists in football
Medalists at the 1924 Summer Olympics
Association football forwards